Abraham Roman also Per Abraham Roman was a Swedish entomologist. He specialised in Ichneumonidae, working on worldwide expedition material in the Stockholm Natural History Museum. His collection is in that institution. Roman made two expeditions to South America.

Works
Partial list
Beiträge zur den schwedischen Ichneumones pentagoni journal? (1919)
Die Ichneumonidentypen C. P. Thunbergs. Zoologiska Bidrag fran Uppsala, 1: 229-293 (1912)
Ichneumoniden aus den Färöern. Mit 6 Figuren Im Texte, Uppsala 1916 (16 Seiten, Arkiv för Zoologi 10: 17) (1916)
Beiträge zur den schwedischen Ichneumones pentagoni (1919)
Entomologische Ergebnisse der schwedischen Kamtschatka-Expedition 1920-1922. 33. Ichneumonidae, Subfamilien Pimplinae und Tryphoninae. Arkiv für Zoologi, 23A (6): 1-32. (193-)

Notes

1872 births
1943 deaths
Swedish entomologists